The 1967 Asian Basketball Confederation Championship for Men were held in Seoul, South Korea.

Results

Final standing

Awards

References
 Results
 archive.fiba.com

Asia Championship, 1967
1967
Basketball 1967
B
ABC Championship
ABC Championship